Irensei is an abstract strategy board game. It is traditionally played with Go pieces (black and white stones) on a Go board (19x19 intersections), but any equipment with which Go can be played is also suitable for Irensei.

How to play 
Black plays first, and players alternate in placing a stone of their colour on an empty intersection. The winner is the first player to get an unbroken row of seven stones horizontally, vertically, or diagonally.

There are two restrictions on this:  (1) A line of seven stones which covers any point on the outer two lines of the board is not a win, and (2) Black cannot make a line of eight or more stones. However, when a group of stones is enclosed by the enemy as by the Go rules, the stones are removed (remember that diagonal is not considered a connection for capturing but is considered a connection for a win). Also, the suicide and Ko rules apply, and indeed are often crucial in winning the game.

References

External links 

 Translation of Japanese used in free game

Abstract strategy games
Japanese games

simple:Irensei